Buramsan is a mountain in South Korea. It sits on the boundary between the district of Nowon-gu in Seoul, the national capital, and the city of Namyangju, in the province of Gyeonggi-do. It also has a heliport at the second peak .

See also
List of mountains in Seoul
List of mountains in Korea

Notes

References

Mountains of South Korea
Mountains of Gyeonggi Province